Carenum ovalee is a species of ground beetle in the subfamily Scaritinae. It was described by Sloane in 1900.

References

ovalee
Beetles described in 1900